Alain Saint-Ogan (August 7, 1895 – June 22, 1974) was a French comics author and artist.

Biography
In 1925, he created the well-known comic strip Zig et Puce (Zig and Flea), which initially appeared in the Dimanche Illustré (Sunday Illustrated), the weekly youth supplement of the French daily newspaper, l'Excelsior.

Among his other comic strips: Mitou et Toti (Mitou and Toti), Prosper l'ours (Prosper the Bear, started in 1933), Monsieur Poche (Mr. Pocket, started in 1934), and Touitoui. In the 1940s, he edited a children's magazine, Benjamin, for which he created the comic strip Troc et Boum (Troc and Boom).

Zig et Puce enjoyed a revival in 1963, when it was taken over by Greg. After World War II, Alain Saint-Ogan also created a daily cartoon for the front page of the Parisien libéré, hosted a radio program, produced television programs and wrote several books, including two memoirs. Shortly before his death in 1974, he was named the honorary president of the first Angoulême International Comics Festival. For a period, the prize for best comic book was named "Alfred" after his creation.

Legacy 

Saint-Ogan is called the "founding father" of French comics, but his involvement with the colonial and imperialist agenda of France in the mid-1900s is often overlooked in the studies of both French-language comics and French imperialist culture today.

His production of colonial propaganda, both by commission from the French government and in his own private enterprises, spanned a wide variety of genres and disciplines, and he was particularly involved with the 'Exposition Coloniale' of 1931. When the French Communist party stood up in opposition to the Exposition and its imperialist ideology, he contributed to the parody of their newspaper, essentially mocking their anti-imperialist views and showing strong support for the colonial discourse of the Exposition. His comics were used to stir up interest among the young for the Exposition and to serve one of its main purposes: to instill into children strong support for the French colonial effort in the effort to ensure its continuation. There are also suggestions that his featuring of the Exposition in 'Zig et Puce', in which he had the characters visit it, was due to him receiving money from the government to publicize the event and stir up the interests of young readers in visiting it.

His work contains in many places imagery supporting colonialism and anti-semitism, which was especially problematic since the audience of his comics were children, thus transforming his work into a sort of right-wing propaganda targeting the youth. Negative racial stereotypes were also used, a prominent example of this being the story line where Zig and Puce visited the Exposition Coloniale, as mentioned above. These include portraying Africans as cannibals, continuing the racial stereotype that Africans are just 'big children', having them appear dumb by speaking only in pidgin French, and drawing them with physical stereotypes that French held about Africans (huge lips, very dark skin, etc.). Saint-Ogan's involvement with France's imperialist mission should not be overlooked, as it was a prominent and harmful feature in his body of work.

References

External links
 Alain Saint-Ogan biography on Lambiek Comiclopedia

1895 births
1974 deaths
People from Colombes
French cartoonists
French comics artists